Stenoptilia saigusai is a moth of the family Pterophoridae. It is found on the island of Honshu in Japan.

The length of the forewings is 9–10 mm.

External links
Taxonomic and Biological Studies of Pterophoridae of Japan (Lepidoptera)
Japanese Moths

saigusai
Moths of Japan
Moths described in 1963